Ole Morten Geving (born 6 August 1974) is a Norwegian politician for the Centre Party.

Born in Nord-Trøndelag, he moved to Hølen at a young age and became a member of the Centre Youth there. He presided the Nordic organization of Centrist youth wings from 1999 to 2001. From 1999 to 2003 he was a member of Flatanger municipal council. Professionally, he worked as a secretary and advisor in the Centre Party, having graduated as cand.polit. from the Norwegian University of Science and Technology in 2000.

In 2006 he was hired in Gambit Hill & Knowlton, and in 2007 he was elected to the municipal council of his native Vestby. In October 2007 he was appointed State Secretary in the Norwegian Ministry of Finance. He left in 2010. In 2011 he was hired as director of trade policy in the Norwegian Savings Banks Association. His position was terminated after Geving was convicted to a prison sentence in Follo District Court.

References

1974 births
Living people
Centre Party (Norway) politicians
Norwegian state secretaries
Akershus politicians
Politicians from Nord-Trøndelag
Norwegian University of Science and Technology alumni